The Walker Fire was a wildfire that burned near Genesee Valley in the Plumas National Forest approximately 11 miles east of the community of Taylorsville in Plumas County, California. The blaze was reported on Wednesday, September 4, 2019 and immediately expanded in size over its several days of burning. The fire actively threatened homes from Genesee Valley to Antelope Road.

Events
Early in the afternoon of Wednesday, September 4, a fire was reported burning southeast of the Flournoy Bridge just outside Genesee Valley. First responders estimated the size of the fire to be roughly between 3 and 5 acres, however, burning with a critical rate of spread due to strong and erratic winds. By late evening of that day, the fire was over 750 acres in size as the community of Genesee Valley was placed under a mandatory evacuation order. On Thursday, September 5, firefighters were reportedly making good progress as the fire was at 5% containment with 850 acres burned.

By Friday, September 6, fire activity had picked up significantly as further erratic, unpredictable winds and dry conditions lead the advancing fireline further into the Plumas National Forest towards the northeast spurring new voluntary evacuations of structures below Forest Road 26N11. The fire, originally burning  Friday morning, had exploded to well over  acres by Friday night due to the severe weather conditions, sending up a massive smoke column that was reportedly seen from as far as Reno. The fire was then over  acres in size by Saturday morning as containment remained at 0%.

The Lassen County Fairground evacuation center was closed that morning. The majority of residential evacuation orders were lifted, except the Murdock Crossing and Stoney areas. The next evening, the fire continued to grow, but was 28 percent contained. Crews extended dozer lines and handlines to expand the containment. Structural defense was put in place for buildings at Murdock Crossing and mop up continued at Antelope Lake, Round Mountain and the eastern side of the fire.

Evacuations and closures

Select areas of Plumas National Forest were closed, specifically within  the Mt. Hough and Beckwourth Ranger Districts. Road closures included : Janesville Grade, Genesee Valley Road at the Flournoy Bridge, Antelope Lake Road from the Flournoy Bridge to Antelope Dam, and beginning at the Flournoy Bridge turnoff, and 111 Beckwourth-Genesee road through the fire area. Highway 395 remained open to the public.

Impact

Communities along Highway 395 from Thunder Mountain Road (Wales Canyon) to the Laufman Grade (Old Highway 59), including the communities of Murdock Crossing, Stoney, Milford and Brockman Canyon, were under mandatory evacuation.

References

External links
 

2019 California wildfires
September 2019 events in the United States
Wildfires in Plumas County, California